Imaging in Medicine is a quarterly peer-reviewed open access medical journal. It covers medical imaging, radiation therapy, radiology, and basic imaging and nuclear medicine. The journal was established in 2009 by Future Medicine. It now is published by Open Access Journals, an imprint of the Pulsus Group, which is on Jeffrey Beall's list of "Potential, possible, or probable" predatory open-access publishers after being acquired by the OMICS Publishing Group in 2016.

Abstracting and indexing
The journal is abstracted and indexed in Chemical Abstracts Service, Embase, and from 2010 to 2014 and 2016 to 2017 in Scopus (discontinued).

References

External links
 

Open access journals
Quarterly journals
English-language journals
Publications established in 2009
Pulsus Group academic journals
Radiology and medical imaging journals